L'Arpeggiata is a European early music group led by Christina Pluhar, and founded by her in 2000. The group has presented both traditional early music and also several collaged and themed performances and recordings.

The group focuses on Italian, French and English music from the 17th century. In their music, they often use instrumental improvisations, in which they work together not only with baroque musicians, but also with jazz musicians.

Regular members of the group are:
 Christina Pluhar, theorbo
 Doron David Sherwin, cornetto
 Veronika Skuplik, baroque violin
 David Mayoral, percussion
 Marcello Vitale, baroque guitar
 Boris Schmidt, double bass
 Eero Palviainen, archlute and baroque guitar
 Sarah Louise Ridy, baroque harp
 Margit Übellacker, psalterium
 Haru Kitamika, harpsichord and organ
 Mira Glodeanu, baroque violin
 Rodney Prada, viola da gamba
 Josetxu Obregón, baroque cello

Discography
 Kapsberger: La Villanella Johannette Zomer, Pino de Vittorio, Hans Jörg Mammel. Alpha Records (2001)
 Stefano Landi: Homo fugi velut umbra... Alpha (2002)
 La Tarantella: Antidotum Tarantulae - with Lucilla Galeazzi and Marco Beasley. Alpha (2002)
 All'Improvviso - Ciaccone, Bergamasche e un po'di folie... Marco Beasley, Lucilla Galeazzi. Alpha (2004)
 Cavalieri: Rappresentatione di Anima, et di Corpo Alpha (2004)
 Los Impossibles. with Pepe Habichuela. Naïve Records
 Monteverdi - Teatro d'Amore Virgin Classics (2009)
 Via Crucis. Nuria Rial, Philippe Jaroussky, Barbara Furtuna Corsican male voice quartet. Virgin Classics (2010)
 Monteverdi: Vespro della Beata Vergine 2CD Virgin Classics (2011)
 Los Pájaros perdidos - The South American Project Philippe Jaroussky Virgin Classics (2012)
 Mediterraneo - Mísia fado singer, Nuria Rial, Raquel Andueza, Vincenzo Capezzuto, Katerina Papadopoulou. Virgin (2013)
 Music for a While: Improvisations on Henry Purcell. Philippe Jaroussky, Raquel Andueza, Vincenzo Capezzuto, Dominique Visse. Erato Records (2014)
 Francesco Cavalli: L'Amore Innamorato. Nuria Rial and Hana Blažíková.  Erato Records (2015)
 Händel Goes Wild: Improvisations on G.F. Handel. Valer Sabadus, Nuria Rial. Erato Records (2017)
 Himmelsmusik, Christina Pluhar & L'Arpeggiata,  Philippe Jaroussky, Céline Scheen, Erato, (2018)
 Luigi Rossi: La Lyra d’Orfeo - Arpa Davidica, Christina Pluhar & L'Arpeggiata, con Véronique Gens, Philippe Jaroussky, Jakub Józef Orliński, Céline Scheen, Giuseppina Bridelli, Valer Sabadus, Erato, (2019)
 Alla Napoletana, Christina Pluhar & L'Arpeggiata, Céline Scheen, Bruno de Sá, Valer Sabadus,   Luciana Mancini, Vincenzo Capezzuto, Alessandro Giangrande, Zachary Wilder, João Fernandes, Erato, (2021)

References

External links

Instrumental early music groups
Musical groups established in 2000